James John McCoy (29 August 1875 – 8 February 1913) was an Australian rules footballer who played with Melbourne in the Victorian Football League (VFL).

External links 

 

1875 births
1913 deaths
Australian rules footballers from Victoria (Australia)
Melbourne Football Club players